Henry H. Wyatt (born November 10, 1840 in Streetsboro, Ohio) was a member of the Wisconsin State Assembly. During the American Civil War, he served with the 2nd California Infantry Regiment and the 2nd Regiment of Cavalry, Massachusetts Volunteers of the Union Army. Conflicts he took part in include the Third Battle of Winchester, the Battle of Cedar Creek and the Battle of Five Forks.

Assembly career
Wyatt was a member of the Assembly during the 1877 session. He was a Republican.

References

People from Portage County, Ohio
People from Monroe County, Wisconsin
People from Vernon County, Wisconsin
Republican Party members of the Wisconsin State Assembly
People of Ohio in the American Civil War
People of Wisconsin in the American Civil War
People of California in the American Civil War
People of Massachusetts in the American Civil War
Union Army soldiers
1840 births
Year of death missing